Jelsa may refer to:


Croatia
Jelsa, Croatia, a municipality on the island of Hvar, Croatia

Norway
Jelsa, Norway, a village in Suldal municipality, Rogaland county
Jelsa (municipality), a former municipality in Rogaland county, now part of Suldal municipality
Jelsa Church, a church in Suldal municipality, Rogaland county

Slovenia
Jelša, Lukovica, a village in the Municipality of Lukovica, central Slovenia
Jelša, Šmartno pri Litiji, a village in the Municipality of Šmartno pri Litiji, central Slovenia

See also
Jelše (disambiguation)